Sergio Martínez vs. Sergiy Dzindziruk is a 160-pound world title fight billed as The Threat Is Real. 2010 Fighter of the Year and #4 Pound for Pound Sergio Martínez takes on undefeated Ukrainian Sergiy Dzindziruk to defend his The Ring middleweight title.

The fight 
Martínez stopped Sergiy Dzinziruk in the eighth round, knocking down the Ukrainian middleweight five times during the fight, and three times in the 8th/last round. In Round 5, Dzinziruk was knocked down again by a left hand just seconds before the bell rang. He got up smiling, but Martínez now firmly appeared to be in control of the fight. Referee Arthur Mercante Jr. stopped the bout at the eighth after Martínez of Oxnard, California, sent Dzinziruk down for the third time.

Undercard

Televised 
Middleweight bout: Sergio Martínez vs.  Sergiy Dzinziruk
Martínez defeated Dzinziruk via technical knockout at 1:43 of eighth round.
Middleweight bout: Andy Lee vs.  Craig McEwan
Lee defeated McEwan via knockout at 0:56  of tenth round.

Untelevised 
Featherweight bout: Javier Fortuna vs.  Derrick Wilson
Fortuna defeated Wilson via knockout of at eighth round.
Heavyweight bout: Sonya Lamonakis vs.  Tanzee Daniel
Lamonakis defeated Daniel via unanimous decision.
Welterweight bout: Abraham Lopez vs.  Andrew Jones
Lopez defeated Jones via unanimous decision.
Light Heavyweight bout: Seanie Monaghan vs.  Billy Cunningham
Monaghan defeated Cunningham via unanimous decision.
Welterweight bout: Thomas Dulorme vs.  Guillermo Valdes
Dulorme defeated Valdes via technical knockout at 0:46 of second round.

Reported fight earnings 

Sergio Martínez $1,200,000 vs. Sergiy Dzinziruk ($850,000)

External links 
HBO

References 

Boxing matches
2011 in boxing
Boxing in Connecticut
Sports in Ledyard, Connecticut
2011 in sports in Connecticut
Boxing on HBO
March 2011 sports events in the United States